Man Wanted may refer to:

 Man Wanted (1932 film), a pre-Code romance film
 Man Wanted (1995 film), a Hong Kong action thriller film

See also
 Wanted Man (disambiguation)